George Hedley may refer to:
 George Hedley (footballer, born 1876) (1876–1942), English footballer and manager
 George Hedley (footballer, born 1882) (1882–1937), English footballer
 George Hedley (1910s footballer), English footballer
 George Hedley (politician) (1817–1879),  English-Australian politician in Victoria

See also
 George Headley, West Indian cricketer
 George W. Headley, jewelry designer and museum founder